Márcio Thomaz Bastos (30 July 1935, in Cruzeiro, São Paulo – 20 November 2014, in São Paulo) was a Brazilian jurist who served as the Minister of Justice of Brazil from 2003 to 2007.

References

1935 births
2014 deaths
Ministers of Justice of Brazil